Wesley Chiu (born March 20, 2005) is a Canadian figure skater. He is a two-time Canadian national bronze medallist (2022–23). He placed fourth at the 2022 World Junior Championships and won two medals on the ISU Junior Grand Prix, including gold at the 2021 JGP France II.

Career

Early years 
Chiu began learning to skate in 2009. In his early years in competitive skating at the national level, he was the 2017 Skate Canada Challenge silver medallist at the pre-novice level. Debuting as a novice the following season, he was the bronze medallist at the 2018 Skate Canada Challenge and finished ninth at the 2018 Canadian Novice Championships. In the 2018–19 season, he won gold at both Skate Canada Challenge and the 2019 Canadian Novice Championships and made his international debut at the advanced novice level by winning the Bavarian Open.

2019–20 season: Junior international debut 
After his novice results, Chiu was selected to make his Junior Grand Prix debut at the 2019 JGP Italy in Egna-Neumarkt. He finished thirteenth. Returning to the domestic scene, he won the silver medal at both Skate Canada Challenge and the 2020 Canadian Junior Championships.

2020–21 season 
Due to the COVID-19 pandemic, the Junior Grand Prix and the rest of the international junior season were cancelled. Chiu competed only domestically, winning bronze at the junior level at a virtually-held Skate Canada Challenge. This would have qualified him to the 2021 Canadian Championships, but these were cancelled due to the pandemic.

2021–22 season: First JGP and national medals 
Chiu returned to international competition with the resumption of the Junior Grand Prix, competing at the second instalment of the French JGP in Courchevel. Due to pandemic restrictions, skaters from Russia could not attend the event. Chiu won the short program by a wide margin but struggled in the free skate, remaining narrowly in first overall and taking the gold medal. Speaking afterwards, he said that the short program result caused "a lot of excitement", as a result of which in "the long program, I feel like I struggled a bit in the beginning, but I was able to push that aside and really finish the program strong." At his second assignment, the 2021 JGP Russia in Krasnoyarsk, he won the bronze medal. He was one of only two non-Russian competitors to podium at the event in any discipline. He landed a quad toe loop in international competition for the first time, calling it "another great milestone I've achieved." Chiu's gold medal qualified him for the 2021–22 Junior Grand Prix Final, intended to be held in Osaka, but it was cancelled due to restrictions prompted by the Omicron variant.

Following the end of the Junior Grand Prix, Chiu was sent to make his international senior debut at the 2021 CS Warsaw Cup. Only eleventh in the short program after missing his jump combination, he rallied in the free skate, skating cleanly and landing two quads in a program for the first time. He set a new personal best and won that segment of the competition, finishing fourth overall, ten points behind bronze medallist Petr Gumennik.

Chiu next competed at the 2022 Canadian Championships in Ottawa, hoping to qualify for one of the two men's berths on the Canadian team for the 2022 Winter Olympics. Not initially considered among the top contenders, he finished a surprise second in the short program. He was only fifth in the free skate after singling a planned triple Axel but narrowly finished third overall, 0.54 points ahead of Joseph Phan. Wearing his first senior national medal, Chiu said his season was "like a rocket ship because it kept going higher and higher and kept getting better." He was named the first alternate for the Olympic team and assigned to attend the 2022 Four Continents Championships in Tallinn, which would have been his ISU championship debut. However, he had to withdraw from Four Continents due to his coach testing positive for COVID-19. Chiu's status as the first alternate for the Olympics briefly came into play when national champion Keegan Messing was initially unable to travel to Beijing due to positive COVID tests, as a result of which Chiu was standing by to depart in his stead. However, Messing was ultimately able to leave in time.

Chiu was assigned to finish his season at the 2022 World Junior Championships, held in mid-April rather than the traditional early March to accommodate a last-minute move from Sofia to Tallinn. Due to Vladimir Putin's invasion of Ukraine, all Russian and Belarusian skaters were banned by the ISU. In the short program, Chiu skated cleanly but for an edge call on his triple flip, receiving a new personal best score of 81.59. He finished second in the segment, 0.33 points ahead of Estonia's Mihhail Selevko and 7.40 points behind leader Ilia Malinin of the USA, winning a silver small medal. Errors in the free skate dropped him to fourth place overall, 5 points behind bronze medallist Tatsuya Tsuboi.

2022–23 season 
Beginning the season on the Challenger circuit, Chiu finished in tenth place at the 2022 CS U.S. Classic. He then made his senior Grand Prix debut at the 2022 Skate America, alongside American training partner Liam Kapeikis. Chiu said he was eager to participate in events with larger audiences. He finished sixth at the event, 0.40 points and one placement ahead of his friend Kapeikis. He was tenth at the 2022 Grand Prix de France.

Chiu won the silver medal at the 2022–23 Skate Canada Challenge, qualifying to the 2023 Canadian Championships. At the national championships, he had a poor short program, finishing eleventh in that segment. He was third in the free skate, rising to third overall and his second consecutive national bronze medal. Chiu related afterwards that he had been sick in advance of the championships, but had persevered through it. He was assigned to compete at the 2023 World Junior Championships.

At the World Junior Championships on home ice in Calgary, Chiu had a bad land on the first part of his planned jump combination, but was still able to complete it. He finished second in the segment for the second consecutive year, coming five points behind Japan's Kao Miura and taking another silver small medal. In the free skate, Chiu doubled both of his attempts at quad toe loop, coming eighth in the segment and dropping to fifth overall. Chiu said that he hoped to compete both at the junior and senior levels the following season, and indicated that he was developing a quad Lutz that was "going well."

Programs

Competitive highlights
GP: Grand Prix; CS: Challenger Series; JGP: ISU Junior Grand Prix.

Detailed results
Current ISU personal bests in bold.

Senior

Junior

References

External links
 
 Rink Results page
 Stats on Ice results page

2005 births
Living people
Canadian male single skaters
Canadian sportspeople of Chinese descent
Sportspeople from British Columbia